Leslie Barringer (1895–1968) was an English editor and author of historical novels and historical fantasy novels, best known for the latter.

Life
Barringer was a Quaker, born in Yorkshire, England. He served in an ambulance unit during World War I, was wounded in action in France and returned to the UK in 1917. After the war he worked at various times as a civil servant (Senior Information Officer with the Central Office of Information) and as an editor for Scottish publishers Thomas Nelson & Sons, for the BBC as an editor on the Radio Times, and in Amalgamated Press as an editor in their encyclopedia department. At Amalgamated Press he provided outlines of world history for their famous Children's Encyclopedia. Barringer and his wife had four daughters.

Works
Most of Barringer's written works were originally published in the 1920s and 1930s, and included the three volumes of the Neustrian Cycle and three independent historical novels set in medieval England.

The Neustrian Cycle
Barringer's main body of work, the Neustrian Cycle, is a trilogy beginning with Gerfalcon; these novels were set around the fourteenth century in an alternate medieval France called Neustria (historically an early division of the Frankish kingdom). According to John Clute, "The basic premise, vaguely presented, is that the Merovingian Dynasty does not split apart c. AD 750; instead, Neustria survives, and at the time of the three tales (c. 1400) is still thriving." He notes further that "The sequence's alternative-world displacement serves not as an opening for magic but as a freeing of LB's imagination; the Neustria Cycle is far more intense and eloquent than his more-straightforward historical novels." The three books revolve around the character of Raoul of Ger, the protagonist of the first book and a secondary character in the later two, Joris of the Rock and Shy Leopardess. Each is a coming of age story.

Posthumous revival
Barringer was obscure as an author during his own lifetime; after his death, however, his fantasies were rediscovered and critically praised by later fantasy authors such as L. Sprague de Camp and Lin Carter, leading to revived interest in them. As a result, a number of reprints appeared in the 1970s and 1980s, most notably as volumes 7, 9 and 13 of the Newcastle Forgotten Fantasy Library in 1976–77. To date there has been no comparable revival of Barringer's other works.

All of Barringer's books are now out of print, although the volumes of the Neustrian Cycle are available as e-books. Copies of all of his works are held in the British Library in London.

Selected works

Neustrian cycle
Gerfalcon (Heinemann 1927, 310 p)
Joris of the Rock (Heinemann 1928, 325 p)
Shy Leopardess (Methuen 1948, 392 p)

Historical novels
Kay the Left-Handed (Heinemann 1935, 284 p)
Know Ye Not Agincourt? (Nelson 1936, 207 p)
The Rose in Splendour: a Story of the Wars of Lancaster and York (Phoenix House 1953, 160 p)

References

External links 
 
 Reginald, Robert. Xenograffiti: essays on fantastic literature. (2005 second edition), I. O. Evans Studies in the Philosophy and Criticism of Literature, number 33 Borgo Press ISSN 0271-9061 
 De Camp, L. Sprague. Literary Swordsmen and Sorcerers: the Makers of Heroic Fantasy. Arkham House, 1976. 
 Carter, Lin. Imaginary Worlds: the Art of Fantasy. Ballantine Books, 1973.
 

1895 births
1968 deaths
English fantasy writers
20th-century English novelists
English historical novelists
English male novelists
English Quakers
Writers from Yorkshire
20th-century English male writers
British Army personnel of World War I